1771 Makover, provisional designation , is a carbonaceous asteroid from the outer region of the asteroid belt, approximately 50 kilometers in diameter.

It was discovered on 24 January 1968, by Russian astronomer Lyudmila Chernykh at the Crimean Astrophysical Observatory in Nauchnyj on the Crimean peninsula. It was named after Russian astronomer Samuel Makover.

Orbit and classification 

The dark C-type asteroid orbits the Sun in the outer main-belt at a distance of 2.6–3.7 AU once every 5 years and 6 months (2,015 days). Its orbit has an eccentricity of 0.18 and an inclination of 11° with respect to the ecliptic.

Physical characteristics 

In December 2011, a rotational lightcurve of Makover was obtained by astronomer Andrea Ferrero from photometric observation. It gave a well-defined rotation period of 11.26 hours with a brightness variation of 0.25 magnitude.

According to the survey carried out by NASA's Wide-field Infrared Survey Explorer with its subsequent NEOWISE mission, Makover measures between 46.89 and 63.59 kilometers in diameter, and its surface has an albedo between 0.025 and 0.072. The Collaborative Asteroid Lightcurve Link derives an albedo of 0.0382 and a diameter of 56.59 kilometers with an absolute magnitude of 10.4.

Naming 

This minor planet was named in honor of Russian astronomer Samuel Gdalevich Makover (1908–1970), who studied extensively the orbit of Encke's Comet (referred to as Comet Encke-Backlund in Russia), and pioneered in the use of electronic calculators for computing planetary perturbations and orbit improvements. He was head of the Institute of Theoretical Astrophysics's (ITA) department of minor planets and comets, and editor of the annual volume of Minor Planet Ephemerides. He was also a vice-president of IAU's commission 20, Positions & Motions of Minor Planets, Comets & Satellites, in the 1960s. The official  was published by the Minor Planet Center on 25 September 1971.

References

External links 
 Asteroid Lightcurve Database (LCDB), query form (info )
 Dictionary of Minor Planet Names, Google books
 Asteroids and comets rotation curves, CdR – Observatoire de Genève, Raoul Behrend
 Discovery Circumstances: Numbered Minor Planets (1)-(5000)  – Minor Planet Center
 
 

001771
Discoveries by Lyudmila Chernykh
Named minor planets
19680124